The 2013–14 OJHL season is the 20th season of the Ontario Junior Hockey League (OJHL) and the fourth since the league existed as two separate bodies in 2009–10. The twenty-two teams of the North, South, East and West Divisions will play 55-game schedules.

Come February, the top teams of each division will play down for the Frank L. Buckland Trophy, the OJHL championship.  The winner of the Buckland Cup will compete in the Central Canadian Junior "A" championship, the Dudley Hewitt Cup.  If successful against the winners of the Northern Ontario Junior Hockey League and Superior International Junior Hockey League, the champion would then move on to play in the Canadian Junior Hockey League championship, the 2014 Royal Bank Cup.

Changes 
Markham Waxers no longer have a franchise.

Current standings 
Note: GP = Games played; W = Wins; L = Losses; OTL = Overtime losses; SOL = Shootout losses; GF = Goals for; GA = Goals against; PTS = Points; x = clinched playoff berth; y = clinched division title; z = clinched conference title; w = eliminated.

Shaded Purple denotes divisional leaders, grey are teams in line for playoff seeds 3 through 8 of their conference.

(*) denotes that Toronto defeated Oakville 6-5 (OT) in a single game playoff for 8th place.

Teams listed on the official league website.

Standings listed by Pointstreak on official league website.

2014 Frank L. Buckland Trophy Playoffs

Playoff results are listed by Pointstreak on the official league website

Dudley Hewitt Cup Championship
Hosted by the Wellington Dukes in Wellington, Ontario.  The Toronto Lakeshore Patriots represented the league at the event and won it.

Round Robin
Toronto Lakeshore Patriots 4 - Fort Frances Lakers (SIJHL) 1
Wellington Dukes 4 - Kirkland Lake Gold Miners (NOJHL) 1
Toronto Lakeshore Patriots 4 - Kirkland Lake Gold Miners (NOJHL) 1
Wellington Dukes 3 - Fort Frances Lakers (SIJHL) 0
Wellington Dukes 5 - Toronto Lakeshore Patriots 3

Semi-final
Toronto Lakeshore Patriots 6 - Fort Frances Lakers (SIJHL) 0

Final
Toronto Lakeshore Patriots 2 - Wellington Dukes 1

2014 Royal Bank Cup Championship
Hosted by the Vernon Vipers in Vernon, British Columbia.  The Toronto Lakeshore Patriots represented the league at the event and finished fifth in the round robin.

Round Robin
Dauphin Kings (MJHL) 2 - Toronto Lakeshore Patriots 1
Toronto Lakeshore Patriots 5 - Yorkton Terriers (SJHL) 1
Carleton Place Canadians (CCHL) 4 - Toronto Lakeshore Patriots 2
Vernon Vipers (BCHL) 3 - Toronto Lakeshore Patriots 2 (OT)

Scoring leaders 
Note: GP = Games played; G = Goals; A = Assists; Pts = Points; PIM = Penalty minutes

Leading goaltenders 
Note: GP = Games played; Mins = Minutes played; W = Wins; L = Losses: OTL = Overtime losses; SL = Shootout losses; GA = Goals Allowed; SO = Shutouts; GAA = Goals against average

Award winners
 Top Scorer - Taylor Best (Whitby Fury)
 Best Defenceman - Michael Prapavessis (Toronto Lakeshore Patriots)
 Most Gentlemanly Player - Michael Prapavessis (Toronto Lakeshore Patriots)
 Most Improved Player - Taylor Best (Whitby Fury)
 Most Valuable Player - Taylor Best (Whitby Fury)
 Rookie of the Year - Jake Walman (Toronto Jr. Canadiens)
 Coach of the Year - James Richmond (Aurora Tigers)
 Best Goaltender - Kevin Entmaa (Aurora Tigers)
 Humanitarian - Kevin Shier (Toronto Lakeshore Patriots)
 Scholastic - Richard Court (Georgetown Raiders)
 Top Prospect - Jake Walman (Toronto Jr. Canadiens)
 Playoff MVP - Kevin Shier (Toronto Lakeshore Patriots)
 Top Executive - Mike Tarantino (Toronto Lakeshore Patriots)
 Top Trainer - Robb Crawford (Whitby Fury)
 Volunteer of the Year - Hal Gies (Milton Icehawks)

Players selected in 2014 NHL Entry Draft
Rd 3 #82 Jake Walman - St. Louis Blues (Toronto Jr. Canadiens)
Rd 4 #105 Michael Prapavessis - Dallas Stars (Toronto Lakeshore Patriots)
Rd 6 #178 Dylan Sikura - Chicago Blackhawks (Aurora Tigers)
Rd 7 #207 Jake Evans - Montreal Canadiens (St. Michael's Buzzers)

See also 
 2014 Royal Bank Cup
 Dudley Hewitt Cup
 List of OJHL seasons
 Northern Ontario Junior Hockey League
 Superior International Junior Hockey League
 Greater Ontario Junior Hockey League
 2013 in ice hockey
 2014 in ice hockey

References

External links 
 Official website of the Ontario Junior Hockey League
 Official website of the Canadian Junior Hockey League

Ontario Junior Hockey League seasons
OJHL